Ashland is a historic home located near Ashland, Bertie County, North Carolina. It was built about 1840, and is a two-story, five-bay, single-pile Greek Revival style frame dwelling.  It is sheathed in weatherboard and has a gable roof.

It was added to the National Register of Historic Places in 2003.

References

Houses on the National Register of Historic Places in North Carolina
Greek Revival houses in North Carolina
Houses completed in 1840
Houses in Bertie County, North Carolina
National Register of Historic Places in Bertie County, North Carolina